Pilnik can refer to:
 Hermann Pilnik
 Pilnik, Warmian-Masurian Voivodeship
 Pilnik, Mrągowo County